Fukuchi (written: 福地) is a Japanese surname. Notable people with the surname include:

, Japanese critic and writer
, Japanese baseball player
, Japanese manga artist

Japanese-language surnames